The canton of Saint-Trivier-sur-Moignans is a former administrative division in eastern France. It was disbanded following the French canton reorganisation which came into effect in March 2015. It consisted of 13 communes, which joined the canton of Villars-les-Dombes in 2015. It had 14,659 inhabitants (2012).

The canton comprised 13 communes:

Ambérieux-en-Dombes
Baneins
Chaleins
Chaneins
Fareins
Francheleins
Lurcy
Messimy-sur-Saône
Relevant
Sainte-Olive
Saint-Trivier-sur-Moignans
Savigneux
Villeneuve

Demographics

See also
Cantons of the Ain department

References

Former cantons of Ain
2015 disestablishments in France
States and territories disestablished in 2015